Ubiquitin-conjugating enzyme E2 J1 is a protein that in humans is encoded by the UBE2J1 gene.

The modification of proteins with ubiquitin is an important cellular mechanism for targeting abnormal or short-lived proteins for degradation. Ubiquitination involves at least three classes of enzymes: ubiquitin-activating enzymes, or E1s, ubiquitin-conjugating enzymes, or E2s, and ubiquitin-protein ligases, or E3s. 

This gene encodes a member of the E2 ubiquitin-conjugating enzyme family. This enzyme is located in the membrane of the endoplasmic reticulum (ER) and may contribute to quality control ER-associated degradation by the ubiquitin-proteasome system.

References

Further reading